Dawn Porter may refer to:

 Dawn Porter (filmmaker), American producer and director
 Dawn O'Porter (born 1979), British television presenter
 Nyree Dawn Porter (1936-2001), actress